This is a list of members of the Victorian Legislative Assembly from 1988 to 1992, as elected at the 1988 state election:

 In January 1989, the National member for Rodney, Eddie Hann, resigned. National candidate Noel Maughan won the resulting by-election on 4 March 1989.
 On 28 February 1989, the Labor member for Greensborough, Pauline Toner, resigned due to ill health, and subsequently died of cancer on 3 March. Labor candidate Sherryl Garbutt won the resulting by-election on 15 April 1989.
 On 16 December 1989, the Labor member for Thomastown, Beth Gleeson, died of cancer. Labor candidate Peter Batchelor won the resulting by-election on 3 February 1990.
 On 20 August 1991, the National member for Shepparton, Peter Ross-Edwards, resigned. National candidate Don Kilgour won the resulting by-election on 19 October 1991.
 On 20 May 1992, the member for South Barwon, Harley Dickinson, resigned from the Liberal Party after losing preselection to recontest his seat. He served for the remainder of his term as an independent.

Members of the Parliament of Victoria by term
20th-century Australian politicians